Nirlirnaqtuuq (ᓂᕐᓕᕐᓇᖅᑑᖅ formerly Neerlonakto Island (alternate: Nerdlernartoq,) is an irregularly shaped, extremely flat, uninhabited island in the Qikiqtaaluk Region, Nunavut, Canada. It is located in Foxe Basin with the mainland's Melville Peninsula is to the west and Baffin Island is to the north.

References

Islands of Foxe Basin
Uninhabited islands of Qikiqtaaluk Region